The Finnis Lithium Project is a lithium mine being developed near Darwin, Northern Territory, Australia.  The project is being developed by Core Lithium.

The ore body was discovered in 2016, feasibility work was done 2018–2020 with a firm investment decision made in September 2021. Commercial production is expected to commence in late 2022.

Geological setup 
The mine encompasses five ore deposits: specifically "Grants, Carlton, Sandras, Hang Gong SW, and BP33.

The "ore bodies of the Finniss lithium project are characterised as lithium-cesium-tantalum (LCT) pegmatite deposits that are hosted within the Burrell Creek metasedimentary rock formation. The pegmatites at the deposits comprise lithium-bearing spodumene, quartz, albite, microcline as well as mica" with a consistent lithium content across the ore body.

Description 
Core Lithium is developing the project, having completed a pre-feasibility study (PFS) in June 2018 and a definitive feasibility study (DFS) in April 2019.  Revisions to the feasibility study were completed in 2020 to incorporate underground mining methods in the mining plan. A revised DFS was completed in July 2021 outlining a project that will occur in multiple stages. The first stage will involve open-pit mining near Grants and Hang Gong, as well as underground mining at the Grants, BP33, and Carlton prospects. The Australian JORC 2012 compliance process estimated 3.45 million tonnes (Mt) of mineral resource at 1.4 percent lithium oxide.  Major Project Status (MPS) was granted by the Australian government in March 2021, recognizing the strategic significance of the project.

Battery-grade lithium hydroxide was produced as part of the test works on spodumene mineral concentrate sample from the project in April 2021. Construction began in 2021 and full operational mining commenced in October 2022, with initial export shipments expected in early 2023.

Development of the mine is an $89 million project. 16 million tonnes of ore are expected to be mined over the 12-year lifespan of the project.  Most lithium concentrate is expected to be exported overseas.

Production and sales 
Tesla, Inc. has contracted for 110,000 tonnes of spodumene concentrate over four years from the Core Lithium and the Finniss lithium mine.

References 

Lithium mines in Australia
Lithium minerals